The Mildred L. Batchelder Award, or Batchelder Award, is an American Library Association literary award that annually recognizes the publisher of the year's "most outstanding" children's book translated into English and published in the U.S.

The Mildred L. Batchelder Award is unusual in that it is given to a publisher yet it explicitly references a given work, its translator and author. It seeks to recognize translations of children's books into the English language, with the intention of encouraging American publishers to translate high quality foreign language children's books and "promote communication between the people of the world".

It is administered by the Association for Library Service to Children (ALSC), the children's division of ALA, and conferred upon the U.S. publisher.

The award is named in honor of Mildred L. Batchelder, former director of the ALSC. One of her stated goals was "to eliminate barriers to understanding between people of different cultures, races, nations, and languages."

The Batchelder Award was inaugurated in 1968 and there have been 47 winners in 48 years through 2015.

From 1994 there have been 38 worthy runners-up called Honor Books, one to three each year.

The 2015 winner is Eerdmans Books for Young Readers, an imprint of William B. Eerdmans Publishing Co., for Mikis and the Donkey, translated by Laura Watkinson. The Dutch original Mikis, de Ezeljongen (2011) was written by Bibi Dumon Tak, illustrated by Philip Hopman.

Mildred L. Batchelder

Batchelder began her career working in an Omaha, Nebraska Public Library, then as a children's librarian at St. Cloud State Teachers College, and subsequently as librarian of Haven Elementary School in Evanston, Illinois. She eventually joined the ranks of the American Library Association in 1936 spending the next 30 years at the ALA promoting the translation of children's literature.

Criteria

Source: "Batchelder Award terms and criteria"
 The award shall be made to an American publisher for a children's book considered to be the most outstanding of those books originally published in a foreign language in a foreign country and subsequently published in English in the United States during the preceding year.
 The Award, in the form of a citation, shall be made annually, unless no book of that particular year is deemed worthy of the honor. The translation should be true to original work and retain the viewpoint of the author.
 The translation should reflect the style of the author and of the original language.
 The book should not be unduly "Americanized." The book's reader should be able to sense that the book came from another country.
 Folk literature is not eligible.
 Picture books are not eligible unless the text is substantial and at least as important as the pictures.
 The book must have the potential to appeal to a child audience (age 0-14).
 The overall design of the book should enhance and not detract from the text, thus making the book more or less effective as a children's book. Such aspects might include: illustration, type face, layout, book jacket, etc.
 Consideration should be given to the retention of the original illustrator's work in the U.S. edition.

Recipients

Winners are distinguished from Honor Books by yellow background and by 'W' in the far right column.

Multiple awards and honors

E. P. Dutton and Enchanted Lion Books have won five Batchelder Awards, Delacorte Press (Dell) four. Several imprints have won three: Arthur A. Levine Books (Scholastic); Lothrop, Lee & Shepard (HarperCollins); Houghton Mifflin. 

Anthea Bell's translations from Danish, French and German have won seven mentions, four Awards and three Honors. Hillel Halkin's translations from Hebrew have four awards. Translations from Greek by Edward Fenton have won three, as have translations from Dutch by Laura Watkinson. Several people have translated two Award winners.

Uri Orlev writing in Hebrew and Alki Zei writing in Greek were the authors of four and three Award-winning works, all of those translated by Halkin and Fenton respectively. Bjarne Reuter wrote two of the winners in Danish, Bibi Dumon Tak two in Dutch, and Josef Holub two in German.

Numbers of Awards and Honors by original language

See also

Notes

References

External links
 Front Street imprint book search at Boyds Mill Press 
 Enchanted Lion Books publisher
 namelos publisher 

American children's literary awards
Awards established in 1968
American Library Association awards
Translation awards
1968 establishments in the United States
English-language literary awards